Billye Aaron is an American television host who is notable as the first African-American woman in the southeastern United States to regularly co-host a television show, starting with her debut on "Today in Georgia", in 1968. Billye went on to host her own show, 'Billye'.

Advocacy

Philanthropy 
Co-founder of Hank Aaron Chasing the Dream Foundation
Founder of UNCF Masked Ball

Personal life 
Billye Jewel Suber was born in Anderson County, Texas on October 16, 1936, to Nathan Suber and Annie Mae Smith. Billye was first married to civil rights activist Samuel Woodrow Williams; they had one child together, Ceci. In 1973, Billye married professional baseball player, Hank Aaron in Jamaica.

Awards 
2003 - Martin Luther King, Jr. “Salute to Greatness”
2016 - YWCA Woman of Achievement

Legacy 
Billye Suber Aaron Pavilion at Morehouse School of Medicine in Atlanta, Georgia.

References

External links 

1936 births
Living people
African-American television talk show hosts
African-American women in business
20th-century American businesswomen
20th-century American businesspeople
21st-century African-American women